The 1980 Espirito Santo Trophy took place 1–4 October at Pinehurst Country Club in Pinehurst, North Carolina, United States. It was the ninth women's golf World Amateur Team Championship for the Espirito Santo Trophy. The tournament was a 72-hole stroke play team event with 28 teams, each with up to three players. The best two scores for each round counted towards the team total.

The United States team won the Trophy, taking back the title from four years ago and winning their seventh title, beating defending champions team Australia by seven strokes. Australia earned the silver medal while team France and the combined team of Great Britain and Ireland, shared the bronze on tied third place another 15 strokes behind.

Teams 
28 teams contested the event. Each team had three players, except Guatemala, who had two.

Results 

Sources:

Individual leaders 
There was no official recognition for the lowest individual scores.

References

External links 
World Amateur Team Championships on International Golf Federation website

Espirito Santo Trophy
Golf in Pennsylvania
Espirito Santo Trophy
Espirito Santo Trophy
Espirito Santo Trophy